Park Bo-gum (born June 16, 1993) is a South Korean actor. He gained recognition for his diverse range of roles in film and television, notably, a psychopathic lawyer in Hello Monster (2015), a genius Go player in Reply 1988 (2015–2016), a Joseon Crown Prince in Love in the Moonlight (2016), a free-spirited man who falls for an older woman in Encounter (2018), and a model who overcomes various hardships to become a successful actor in Record of Youth (2020).

Park was the youngest artist to be named Gallup Korea's Television Actor of the Year. He was also the first ever actor to top the Korea Power Celebrity list by Forbes Korea.

Early life and education
Born in Seoul on June 16, 1993, Park is the youngest of three siblings. "Bo-gum" (寶劍) means 'precious sword'. His mother died when he was in fourth grade.  He started learning to play the piano when he was in kindergarten and was a pianist and choir member at church. He was also on the varsity swimming team of Seoul Mokdong Middle School.

During Park's sophomore year of high school he sent a video of himself singing and playing the piano to prominent talent management agencies which led to several offers. Park, who initially wanted to be a singer-songwriter, later changed his career path after a suggestion that he would do well acting. He graduated from Shinmok High School in 2012, and enrolled at Myongji University as a Musical Theater undergraduate in March 2014. Despite his acting career, he maintained an active collegiate life and represented his university's cultural overseas exchange program in Europe. Park has also directed a one-act play based on Anton Chekov's works, and served as music director in his graduating class's production of Hairspray. He received his baccalaureate in February 2018.

Career

2011–2013: Beginnings
Park debuted as an actor under Sidus HQ, playing a supporting role in the thriller film Blind (2011). He then joined Blossom Entertainment and featured in the action-comedy film Runway Cop (2012), one-off KBS drama special Still Picture (2012) and the period drama Bridal Mask (2012). In 2013, he landed his first major role in the weekend drama Wonderful Mama playing the playboy son of Bae Jong-ok's character.

2014–2015: Rising popularity and breakthrough
In 2014, Park played the teenage version of Lee Seo-jin's character in the melodrama Wonderful Days and played a prodigy cellist in the KBS2'S Naeil's Cantabile, an adaptation of the Japanese manga Nodame Cantabile. The roles earned Park Best New Actor nominations in both the KBS Drama Awards and APAN Star Awards.

He next featured in box-office hits A Hard Day (2014) which also screened at Cannes Film Festival and The Admiral: Roaring Currents (2014) which became the highest grossing Korean film at the time.

In May 2015, Park joined Music Bank as a co-host alongside Red Velvet's Irene. They both gained attention for their chemistry as well as singing and hosting skills. The press called them one of the best partnerships in the show's history, and Park was awarded the Best Newcomer Award at the KBS Entertainment Awards.

A departure from his previous roles and public image, Park gained rave reviews from audience and critics with his scene-stealing role in crime drama Hello Monster (2015). The portrayal won him the Popularity and Best Supporting Actor awards at the year-end KBS Drama Awards. The same year, he featured in Coin Locker Girl which screened at Cannes Film Festival. The role earned him a nomination for Best New Actor in Film at the Baeksang Arts Awards and won him a Rising Star Award at the 11th MaxMovie Awards.

He then starred as one of the leads in the third installment of the Reply series where he played the genius Go-player Choi Taek in Reply 1988 (2015). The show was a hit with audience ratings peaking at 18.8%  making it the highest rated Korean drama in cable television history that year, and earned Park the nickname "Nation's Little Brother". The role catapulted him to fame in Korea and made him known as an emerging Korean Wave star, with the Top Chinese Music Awards presenting him with Best International Artist Award, the American-based DramaFever Awards giving him the Best Rising Star Award and tvN10 awarding him Asia Star Award.

2016–2021: Mainstream success
In February 2016, Park featured in tvN's travel program Youth Over Flowers: Africa.
After more than a year as Music Bank host, he left the show in June 2016.

In August 2016, he starred in KBS2's historical drama Love in the Moonlight alongside Kim Yoo-jung. A domestic and overseas hit, Moonlight achieved peak audience rating of 23.3%. Its popularity was called "Moonlight Syndrome", and solidified Park's status as a versatile leading actor. He received several accolades for the role including a Best Actor nomination and Popularity Award at the 53rd Baeksang Arts Awards, as well as the Top Excellence Award at the 30th KBS Drama Awards. Park also released his first soundtrack for Moonlight'''s OST entitled "My Person" which topped Melon, Mnet, Bugs, olleh, Soribada, Genie, Naver and Monkey3 charts upon its release and debuted at #3 on Gaon Music Chart.

He embarked on his first Asia-wide fan meeting tour in the tail-end of 2016, visiting eight cities and meeting more than 30,000 fans in the continent's East and Southeast regions until March 2017.

After a two-year hiatus, he returned in the small screen with romantic-melodrama Encounter (2018) alongside Song Hye-kyo. He plays a freewheeling, ordinary young man who finds joy in the simplest things.

In 2019, Park released his first Japanese single, "Bloomin".

On March 18, 2020, Park released his first Japanese album, Blue Bird. The same year, he was cast in the youth drama Record of Youth as a model who is shifting to an acting career. On August 10, 2020, Park released his new single All My Love to celebrate the 9th anniversary of his debut. His single album for All My Love was released on August 12, 2020.

In 2021, Park starred in the science fiction thriller film Seo Bok in the title role, his return to the big screen in six years.

2022–present: Comeback from military
Park reunited with the director and cast members of Love in the Moonlight in the travel entertainment program Young Actors' Retreat, which was released in September 2022 on TVING. In December 2022, Park ended his contract with Blossom Entertainment after for about 10 years.

In January 2023, Park signed with new agency, The Black Label. On January 27, 2023, it was confirmed that Park would star in Lim Sang-choon's upcoming television series.

Personal life
Military service

On August 31, 2020, Park enlisted in the navy military band as a cultural promotion soldier as part of his obligatory military service. He was promoted to a sergeant in November 2021. Park was scheduled to be discharged from military service on April 30, 2022. After applying to the unit to use up his remaining personal and pre-discharge leave, he was discharged early on February 21, 2022, without returning to the unit after his last vacation in accordance with the Ministry of Defense guidelines for prevention of the spread of COVID-19.

During his military service, Park obtained a license to be a hairdresser. He also hosted 2020 Republic of Korea Navy Patriotic Concert in October 2020, 6th West Sea Protection Day Commemoration Ceremony in March 2021, Republic of Korea Navy Patriotic Concert in June 2021, and 2021 Republic of Korea Navy Patriotic Concert in October 2021.

Filmography

Discography
On March 18, 2020, Park Bo-gum released his debut solo album blue bird, with 11 tracks including the single "Bloomin" from 2019.

On March 14, 2020, Park Bo-gum released official MV for the title track "Dear My Friend" from the solo album blue bird.

On June 16, 2020, Park Bo-gum's agency Blossom Entertainment revealed through Instagram that the actor will be releasing a new song produced by Sam Kim.

Park Bo-gum prepared the song "All My Love" as a gift filled with his feelings for his fans. Singer-songwriter Sam Kim wrote the lyrics, composed, and produced "All My Love", and it is a song with a sentimental melody in which actor Park Bo-gum's uniquely sweet voice shines through. Aligning with his debut anniversary, the song was released through music services all over the world on August 10, and the single album was released on August 12 in Korea and Japan simultaneously.

Singles

Studio albums

Awards and nominations

 State honors

 Listicles 

Notes

 Others 
In 2016, at the age of 23, Park became the youngest artist to be named Gallup Korea's Television Actor of the Year.<ref>{{cite web |script-title=ko:박보검, 올해를 빛낸 탤런트 1위…'응팔구르미' 연타석 홈런|trans-title=Park Bo-gum is Gallup's Actor of the Year after "Reply" and "Moonlight"|url=http://news.naver.com/main/read.nhn?mode=LSD&mid=sec&sid1=103&oid=001&aid=0008890315|date=December 14, 2016|website=Yonhap News|language=ko}}</ref> In 2017, he topped Forbes magazine's Korea Power Celebrity list, making him the first ever actor to do so.

Endorsements
Park Bo-gum is an endorser of a wide range of brands in and outside South Korea. The "Park Bo-gum Effect", coined by the Korean Business Research Institute, refers to his consistent high brand reputation ranking indicating his effectiveness as an endorser across different demographics. He was voted by marketing executives as Top Celebrity Endorser of 2017. Park was torchbearer of the 2018 Winter Olympics as "Korea's Representative Actor", and endorser of Coca-Cola.

References

External links

 
 
 

1993 births
Living people
People from Seoul
21st-century South Korean male actors
South Korean male film actors
South Korean male television actors
Myongji University alumni